Ian Cowan (27 November 1944 – 8 November 2016), nicknamed "Cowboy", was a Scottish footballer who played as a right winger.

Career
Cowan started his career with Falkirk in 1959 before moving to Partick Thistle in 1961 where he made nearly 100 appearances for the Firhill club. He then moved on to St Johnstone before returning to Falkirk. Subsequently, Cowan turned out for Dunfermline Athletic, Southend United, K.V. Oostende and Albion Rovers.

References

External links

1944 births
2016 deaths
Falkirk F.C. players
Partick Thistle F.C. players
Southend United F.C. players
St Johnstone F.C. players
Dunfermline Athletic F.C. players
Albion Rovers F.C. players
Rutherglen Glencairn F.C. players
Camelon Juniors F.C. players
K.V. Oostende players
Association football wingers
Scottish footballers
Scottish expatriate footballers
Expatriate footballers in Belgium
Scottish Football League players
English Football League players
Whitburn Junior F.C. players